UFC Fight Night: Sanchez vs. Riggs (also known as UFC Fight Night 7) was a mixed martial arts event held by the Ultimate Fighting Championship on December 13, 2006 at the MCAS Miramar near San Diego, California.  It was the first UFC event to take place on a military base.  The audience consisted almost entirely of United States Marines stationed at Miramar; only five pairs of seats were available to the public via auction.  All auction proceeds went to the Marine Corps Community Services Quality of Life Programs for the Marines and Families.

The two-hour broadcast drew a 1.3 overall rating on Spike TV. The disclosed fighter payroll for the event was $163,000.

Results

See also
 Ultimate Fighting Championship
 List of UFC champions
 List of UFC events
 2006 in UFC

References

External links
Official event page

Fighter Salaries

UFC Fight Night
2006 in mixed martial arts
Mixed martial arts in San Diego
Sports competitions in San Diego
2006 in sports in California
Events in San Diego